Doro is a village and a refugee camp in Maban County, Upper Nile State, South Sudan. It was previously a part of Upper Nile state.

References

Upper Nile (state)
Refugee camps in South Sudan